Gerda Voitechovskaja (born 15 May 1991) is a Lithuanian badminton player.

Achievements

BWF International Challenge/Series (3 titles) 
Women's singles

Women's doubles

  BWF International Challenge tournament
  BWF International Series tournament
  BWF Future Series tournament

References

External links 
 

1991 births
Living people
Lithuanian female badminton players
Badminton players at the 2019 European Games
European Games competitors for Lithuania